Wielka may refer to:

Places in Poland
 Wielka Klonia
 Wielka Komorza
 Wielka Lipa
 Wielka Nieszawka
 Wielka Słońca
 Wielka Wieś
 Wielka Wola
 Wielka Łąka

Other
Wielka Krokiew, ski jump in Zakopane, Poland